Igor Lukšič (born 3 December 1961) is a Slovenian political scientist, politician and was president of the Slovenian Social Democrats (June 2012 – May 2014). Between November 2008 and February 2012, he served as minister of education in the center-left government of Borut Pahor.

Lukšič was born in Novo Mesto in the People's Republic of Slovenia, then part of FPR Yugoslavia. He started his academic career as a teaching assistant at the Faculty of Social Sciences of the University of Ljubljana in 1986 and obtained his PhD at the University of Ljubljana in 1993. Subsequently, he became an assistant professor and later, in 1998, an associate professor. In 1999, he was named vice-dean and in 2001, dean of the Faculty of Social Sciences at the University of Ljubljana. Between 2008 and 2011, he worked as the minister of education and sport.

He was the vice president of Social Democrats until March 2009. Later, on 2 June 2012, he was elected president of the Social Democrats, but stepped down in 2014, after his party won only one MEP seat in European Parliament election.

Books written 
 Demokracija v pluralni družbi - Preverjanje veljavnosti konsociativne teorije (Democracy in a Plural Society), 1991
 Liberalizem versus korporativizem (Liberalism versus Corporativism), 1994, 
 Politični sistem Republike Slovenije (The Political System of the Republic of Slovenia), 2001,

References

External links 
 Ministry of Education and Sport
 Faculty of Social Sciences personal page

|-

1961 births
Living people
Ministers of Education and Sports of Slovenia
People from Novo Mesto
Social Democrats (Slovenia) politicians
University of Ljubljana alumni
Academic staff of the University of Ljubljana